is a city located in Aichi Prefecture, Japan. , the city had an estimated population of 61,320 in 23,451 households, and a population density of 919 persons per km². Aisai is a member of the World Health Organization’s Alliance for Healthy Cities (AFHC).

Geography
Aisai is located in the coastal flatlands of far western Aichi Prefecture, bordering Gifu Prefecture on the west. It has a short border with Mie Prefecture to the southwest. The Kiso River and the Nagara River pass through the city.

Climate
The city has a climate characterized by hot and humid summers, and relatively mild winters (Köppen climate classification Cfa).

Demographics
Per Japanese census data, the population of Aisai has been relatively steady over the past 30 years.

Surrounding municipalities
Aichi Prefecture
Tsushima
Kanie
Inazawa
Yatomi
Ama
Mie Prefecture
Kuwana
Gifu Prefecture
Kaizu

History

Early modern period
During the Edo period, the area of modern Aisai was controlled by the Yokoi clan, retainers of the Owari Tokugawa of Nagoya.

Late modern period
During the Meiji period, the area was organized into several villages under Kasai District and Kaito District, Aichi Prefecture, which later became Ama District, Aichi in the Taishō period.

Contemporary history
The city of Aisai was created through the merger on April 1, 2005 of the towns of Saya and Saori and villages of Hachikai and Tatsuta.

Government

Aisai has a mayor-council form of government with a directly elected mayor and a unicameral city legislature of 18 members. The city contributes one member to the Aichi Prefectural Assembly.  In terms of national politics, the city is part of Aichi District 8 of the lower house of the Diet of Japan.

Economy
Aisai is noted for its production of edible lotus root. Other main agricultural include ginger, strawberries, tomatoes, and the brewing of sake.

Education
Aisai has twelve public elementary schools and eight public junior high schools operated by the city government, and two public high schools operated by the Aichi Prefectural Board of Education. There are also two private high schools. The prefecture also operates one special education school for the handicapped.

Transportation

Railways

Conventional lines
Central Japan Railway Company
Kansai Main Line：-  -
Meitetsu
Tsushima Line：-  –  -
Bisai Line：-  –  --(Tsushima)-- --(Inazawa)-- -

Roads

Expressways
 Higashi-Meihan Expressway

Japan National Route

Local attractions

Kokie castle
Morikawa lotus field

Notable people from Aisai
Katō Takaaki , pre-war Prime Minister of Japan
Shoichi Yokoi, Imperial Japanese Army holdout found in Guam
Daiki Wakamatsu, professional soccer player
 Ryoji Kuribayashi, professional baseball pitcher for  Hiroshima Toyo Carp and 2021 Central League Rookie of the Year

Gallery

References

External links
 Aisai City official website 
 

Cities in Aichi Prefecture
Aisai, Aichi